Nova 100 (call sign: 3MEL) is a commercial radio station in Melbourne, Victoria, Australia, broadcasting on 100.3 MHz.

The station is owned by NOVA Entertainment along with sister station, smoothfm 91.5.

History
Nova 100 commenced on the Melbourne airwaves at 7 am Australian Eastern Daylight Time on Monday 3 December 2001, and was the first new commercial radio station in Melbourne for 21 years. Breakfast presenter Kate Langbroek was the first voice heard on the station, with Missy Elliott's song "Get Ur Freak On" being the first song played on the new station.

Hughesy, Kate & Dave was the inaugural breakfast show with Dave Hughes, Kate Langbroek and Dave O'Neil. Dave O'Neil later resigned and moved to Vega 91.5 in July 2006. Both Dave Hughes and Kate Langbroek remained with the station until November 2013.

The station is a major player in the Melbourne radio market, initially with its 'Sounds Different' format playing alternative, hip-hop, pop & dance music, with a strong lean toward new releases. In 2010, Nova announced that it would remove their policy of "never more than two ads in a row", increasing the number of commercials broadcast per hour from 12 to 21 during the peak times of breakfast and drive. Since 2010, the station has broadcast an Adult Contemporary format, in competition with the Australian Radio Network-owned KIIS 101.1.

In December 2013, Meshel Laurie and Tommy Little replaced Dave Hughes and Kate Langbroek with their new show Meshel & Tommy. In November 2015, Nova announced that Chrissie Swan, Sam Pang and Jonathan Brown will host breakfast in 2016 after Meshel Laurie and Tommy Little announced their resignation from the station. Chrissie, Sam & Browny commenced in January 2016, with Meshel currently hosts the breakfast show Matt & Meshel on KIIS 101.1 along with Matt Tilley.

In December 2016, Nova announced that it will network Greg Burns and Dan Cassin from Nova 96.9 as opposed to local announcers.

Despite having yet to achieve a #1 overall rating for the station in the GfK ratings, Nova 100 continues to hold the #1 position for the women in the 45–54 age demographic and has the #4 drive show with Kate, Tim & Marty around Australia.

In April 2019, Nova overhauled its daytime schedule announcing that Matt Tilley would join the station. Tilley remained with the station until November.

On 21 October 2022, it was announced that Chrissie, Sam & Browny will end after seven years with the final show being on 2 December. Ben Harvey, Liam Stapleton and Belle Jackson will host Ben, Liam & Belle from 5 December 2022.

In January 2023, Nova 100 re-located from studios at 678 Victoria Street, Richmond (with sister station smoothfm 91.5) to 257 Clarendon Street, South Melbourne. Southern Cross Austereo's Triple M previously occupied the studios.

Transmission
Nova 100 operates on the 100.3 MHz FM frequency from the TXA Observatory Rd tower on Mount Dandenong. The transmitter is a Broadcast Electronics FM 10S with an FXi digital exciter. Its transmitter power is 9.5KW which gives a 56 kw ERP.

Announcers
Ben, Liam & Belle, 6:00am–9:00am
Jamie Row, 9:00am–1:00pm
Mel Tracina, 1:00pm–3:00pm
Ricki-Lee, Tim & Joel, 3:00pm–6:00pm
Smallzy's Surgery, 7:00pm–10:00pm
Mason Tucker, 10:00pm–1.00am

News
Ash Gardner (Breakfast)
Michelle Stephenson (National News Manager)

References

External links
Nova 100
Nova 100 Facebook
Nova 100 Twitter

Contemporary hit radio stations in Australia
Nova Entertainment
Nova (radio network)
Radio stations established in 2001
Radio stations in Melbourne